The list of hoards in the Isle of Man comprises significant archaeological hoards of coins, jewellery, precious and scrap metal objects and other valuable items discovered in the Isle of Man. It includes both hoards that were buried with the intention of retrieval at a later date (personal hoards, founder's hoards, merchant's hoards, and hoards of loot), and also hoards of votive offerings which were not intended to be recovered at a later date, but excludes grave goods and single items found in isolation. The list is subdivided into sections according to archaeological and historical periods.

Viking hoards
From the 9th to the 13th centuries the Isle of Man was part of the Viking-ruled Kingdom of the Isles, and several significant hoards from this period have been found on the Isle of Man.  Viking hoards generally comprise a mixture of silver coins, silver jewellery and hacksilver that has been taken in loot.

Later Medieval hoards
Hoards dating to the later medieval period, from 1066 to about 1500, mostly comprise silver pennies.

See also

 List of hoards in Great Britain
 List of hoards in Ireland
 List of hoards in the Channel Islands
 List of metal detecting finds

Notes

Footnotes

Hoards in the Isle of Man
History of the Isle of Man
Treasure troves